Lodewijk van der Helst (1642 – ?), was a Dutch Golden Age painter.

Biography
He was born in Amsterdam as the son and pupil of Bartholomeus van der Helst and grew up at Nieuwmarkt. Early 1671 he and his sister Susanne assisted their mother when they visited their father's studio, located near Walloon church (behind "Vleeshal") where his belongings were registered. His father owned many painting by Willem van de Velde the younger, the schilder-boeck by Karel van Mander, Metamorphoses by Ovid, Serlio, Scamozzi, Vitruvius and Palladio; portraits of Dutch admirals (Egbert Bartholomeusz Kortenaer, etc.)

The artist married in 1677, living on Herengracht. He disagreed and quarrelled with his sister about the heritage after their mother died. In 1680 a son Lodewijk was baptized. He appears to have left the city by 1684 after his wife died who left two children behind. His place and date of death is unknown. Lodewijks portrait of admiral Augustus Stellingwerf was engraved by Abraham Blooteling.

References
 
Lodewijk van der Helst on Artnet 
 

1642 births
Dutch Golden Age painters
Dutch male painters
Painters from Amsterdam